Inanidrilus bonomii is a species of annelid worm. It is known from subtidal coarse coral sands in Italy, in the Mediterranean.

References

bonomii
Invertebrates of Europe
Fauna of the Mediterranean Sea
Taxa named by Christer Erséus
Animals described in 1984